Erin Bethea (born August 12, 1982) is an American actress. She is known for appearing in Sherwood Pictures' films, Facing the Giants and Fireproof. She most recently wrote, produced and starred in the film New Life.

Background
Bethea is the daughter of Michael and Terri Catt. Her father, Dr. Michael Catt, was the senior pastor at Sherwood Baptist Church, which owns Sherwood Pictures. Her mother, Terri Catt, was the Wardrobe Coordinator for both Facing the Giants and Fireproof. Her sister, Hayley Catt, was a still photographer, production secretary, and website coordinator for Fireproof and Courageous.

In 2004, Bethea received a Bachelor of Arts degree in Theatre at the University of Mobile.

On July 17, 2020, Erin married Drew Waters, whom she met in 2013.

Filmography

References

External links 
 
 
 
 Erin Bethea interview at The Augusta Chronicle

1982 births
Living people
University of Mobile alumni
Actresses from Georgia (U.S. state)
21st-century American women